Catherine Mardon is a Canadian writer, activist, and lawyer.

Biography 
Catherine Mardon was born in Oklahoma, but spent many years living in St. Petersburg, Florida. She currently lives in Canada. Her academic background includes a Bachelor of Science in Agriculture from Oklahoma State University, a Juris Doctor from the University of Oklahoma, and a Bachelor of Art from Newman University. She received a Master's degree in Theological Studies from Newman Theological College in Edmonton, Alberta, Canada.

Mardon is a social activist, having worked for family farmers, with ecumenical organizations, for the homeless, and as a speaker on social justice issues. She was admitted to the Oklahoma Bar in 1988. Her legal practice also included archdiocesan tribunal work, death penalty appeals, and a variety of low income concerns. Mardon was also a mediation trainer responsible for the recruitment, training, supervision and evaluation of over 180 volunteer mediators.

After being attacked in 1991 for providing testimony against the leader of a white supremacist group, which left her with physical injuries, a traumatic brain injury and PTSD, she became an advocate for the disabled.

Mardon has written many books on mental illness and a series of children's books that have been translated into 18 different languages.

She is married to fellow writer and activist Austin Mardon

Bibliography 
 Curveballs (2012)
 Gandy and Parker Escape the Zoo: An Illustrated Adventure (2013, with Austin Mardon)
 Screwballs (2015)
 Gandy and the Princess (2015, with Austin Mardon)
 Gandy and the Cadet (2015)
 Gandy and the Man in White (2016, with Austin Mardon)
 ''Gandy and the Man in Black.(2016)
 Gandy and the Underwater City(2017)
 Gandy and the Sea Cow(2016)
 Gandy and the Mastodon(2015)
 Gandy At the Beach (2017)
 Gandy and the Fiddler (2017)
 Gandy and the Lumberjack (2017)
 Gandy and the Bonefish (2017)
 Gandy and the Lady (2018)
 Gandy and Christopher 
 Gandy and the Musician (2017)
 Gandy and the Piper
 Canadian Polar Explorers
 Alphabet Soup
 Therapeutic Parenting
 Hoarding the Family Secret Behind Closed Doors.
 Listen to the Right Voices: Pastoral Care of Persons with Schizophrenia 
 The A Word
 How to Build and Maintain Relationships with Mental Illness

Awards and honors 
Dame Commander in the Order of St. Sylvester, a Papal Knighthood(2017)
Sovereign's Medal for Volunteers(2018) 
 Leon A. McNeill Distinguished Alumni Award, Newman University (2022) 
 Honour Officer, Alberta Royal Canadian Army Cadets (2018)
 Regent's Distinguished Scholar - Oklahoma State University
 Marian Medal - National Conference of Catholic Bishops
 Queen Elizabeth II Diamond Jubilee Medal (2012)
 Queen Elizabeth II Platinum Jubilee Medal (2022)
 Diocesan Officer - Catholic Women's League
 Edmonton Archdiocese
 2016 True Grit Award - The Lieutenant Governor of Alberta's Circle on Mental Health and Addiction
 Former President – Catholic Women's League, St. Alphonsus, Edmonton
 Former President – Veterans of Foreign Wars Auxiliary

References 

Canadian lawyers
Canadian women non-fiction writers
Living people
Year of birth missing (living people)
Canadian women children's writers